"I Wanna Be a Boss" is a song by American singer-songwriter Stan Ridgway and was the first and only single released in support of his 1991 album Partyball.

Formats and track listing 
All songs written by Stan Ridgway, except where noted.

UK 7" single (EIRS 166)
"I Wanna Be a Boss" – 4:52
"Camouflage" – 7:16

UK CD single (CDEIRS 166)
"I Wanna Be a Boss" – 4:50
"Camouflage" – 7:12
"Calling Out to Carol" – 4:09

European CD single (560-20 4322 2)
"I Wanna Be a Boss" – 4:50
"Nadine" (Berry) – 3:25
"Uba's House of Fashions" (Berardi, Ramirez, Ridgway, Sauser-Hall, Schulz, Wexstun) – 4:16

Charts

References

External links 
 

1991 songs
1991 singles
I.R.S. Records singles
Stan Ridgway songs
Songs written by Stan Ridgway